But When do the Girls Get Here? is a 2005 Italian comedy-drama film written and directed by Pupi Avati. The film won the David di Donatello for best score.

Cast 

Claudio Santamaria: Nick
Vittoria Puccini: Francesca
Paolo Briguglia: Gianca
Johnny Dorelli:  Gianca's Father

References

External links

2005 films
Italian comedy-drama films
Films directed by Pupi Avati
2005 comedy-drama films
Films scored by Riz Ortolani
2000s Italian films